Peng Xuefeng (September 9, 1907 – September 11, 1944) was a New Fourth Army general officer during the Second Sino-Japanese War.

Early life 
Peng was born in Zhenping County, Henan. He was not related to Marshal Peng Dehuai.

Personal life 
Peng was killed in action in Xiayi County, Henan 5 months before the birth of his son. Peng was 37 years old.
Peng's son is Peng Xiaofeng, a retired general in the People's Liberation Army.

Chinese Civil War

War of Resistance against Japan

1907 births
1944 deaths
New Fourth Army generals
Military personnel killed in action during the Republic of China era
People from Zhenping County, Henan